Timecop 2: The Berlin Decision (also known as Timecop: The Berlin Decision, and Timecop 2) is a 2003 American cyberpunk science fiction action film directed by Steve Boyum. The film is based on the comic book of the same name by Mike Richardson and Mark Verheiden, and is a sequel to 1994's Timecop starring Jean-Claude Van Damme. The film stars Jason Scott Lee, with a supporting cast of Thomas Ian Griffith, Mary Page Keller and John Beck. The film was released on direct-to-DVD in the United States on September 30, 2003. It is the second installment in the Timecop film series.

Plot 
The film introduces new characters and takes place twenty one years after the previous film.

In 2025, time travel technology has improved considerably; Time Enforcement Commission (TEC), the agency that monitors time travel, is still keeping the past safe and after the events of the previous film, Society for Historical Authenticity (SHA) is established to ensure that TEC personnel do not alter history. However, the Society's leader, Brandon Miller, believes he has the responsibility to change history based on a "moral obligation to right the wrongs of the past" and plans to do so by traveling back to Berlin in 1940 and kill Adolf Hitler. TEC agent Ryan Chang is sent back to stop him, but in the resulting fight, Miller's wife, Sasha, part of the SHA, ends up dead. Miller is imprisoned in the World Penitentiary for trying to change history, and Ryan Chang begins arresting Miller's close Society friends. In Atlantic City in 1895, Ryan prevents SHA member Frank Knight from robbing Andrew Carnegie. Knight accuses the TEC of being murderers when they execute him. Ryan is haunted by memories of when his father, Josh, died of a brain aneurysm in 2002. Josh was lecturing about time travel at the University of Southern California, and had a heated debate on the morals of altering history.

TEC agent Douglas illegally makes physical contact with his younger self and they are suddenly merged, causing the agent to wink out of existence. Without the agent ever existing, a key Brandon Miller associate isn't arrested and Miller is able to leave prison on a technicality. Miller sets out to eliminate every TEC operative by traveling back in time and killing their ancestors, making it as if the agents never existed. Miller could then change history with impunity since there wasn't anyone to stop him. Eventually, Ryan is the only agent left and he has to stop Miller.

Ryan fights his way through rioters at the World Penitentiary, killing an inmate with a grudge against him on his way to confront Miller, but is unable to convince him that what he wants to do is wrong. Back in his present time, Ryan finds changes to history; Doc is more irascible because her husband was "killed in the war". When he returns to the World Penitentiary, Miller was never there at all. Ryan, becoming less and less capable of surviving all these time jumps, returns to 2025 again. This time, the world is even more different due to Miller's interference: Ryan's parents were "killed in the war", Doc has been executed for trying to save her husband and O'Rourke wears an eye patch and has never heard of Hitler.

Ryan is issued a tracker that enables him to follow Miller by jumping into the wake of his time leaps. He is sent to 1881 and prevents Miller from killing an ancestor named Jason in Springfield, Texas, then chases him to 1929 where he saves a Frances in a Chinese restaurant. In a nightclub in 1988, Ryan is embarrassed to see his young parents disco dancing and lures Miller away from them. Miller shoots Ryan, but the bullet is stopped by the pocket watch that his father bequeathed to him. Returning to his own era, where things are mostly back to normal, he realizes that his father died when Miller tried to kill Ryan at age 11. Barely surviving another time leap, Ryan goes to the University of Southern California on 7 May 2002.

The student who disagreed with Josh was a young Brandon Miller. Josh tries to stop the older Miller from killing Ryan, but is killed by one of Miller's weapons that induces brain aneurysms. The older Ryan intervenes, threatening to erase Miller's existence by killing his younger self. The older Miller taunts Ryan by accusing him of hypocritically being willing to change history. He provokes him into a fight, watched by the younger Miller, younger Ryan and his mother, and Sasha. When Ryan has Miller at his mercy, he tells the younger Miller that “it doesn’t have to be this way. You can change all this.” Ryan and Miller then disappear, suggesting that the younger Miller changed his mind. In 2025, Ryan's colleagues who were erased by Miller are back, although Doc still refuses to date Timecops and Ryan appears to retain his memories of the changes Miller made.

Cast
 Jason Scott Lee as TEC Agent Ryan Chang
Sam Ly as Young Ryan Chang
 Thomas Ian Griffith as Brandon Miller
 Mary Page Keller as "Doc"
 John Beck as Director O'Rourke
 Tava Smiley as TEC Agent Tyler Jeffers
 Josh Hammond as Michael Travis
 Tricia Barry as Sasha Miller
 Wen Yann Shih as Cyndi Chan
 Kenneth Choi as Professor Josh Chan
 Toshi Toda as Sushwel, Japanese Diplomat
 Pete Antico as Frank Knight
 Ken Lally as Schultz
 Peter Dykstra as Tony Banks
 Sven-Ole Thorsen as SS Bodyguard
 Jonathan Klein as Jonathon Hanley
 Neil Dickson as Neil Johnson
 Joe Sabatino as Sergeant O'Hera
 Mike Upton as Douglas
 Marty Murray as Broderick Lynwood
 Izzy Assencas as Jackson
 April Fissell as Rose Anderson / Francis Chan
 Robert Carradine as Jim "Big Jim"
 Steve Van Wormer as Jason Anderson
 Ron Gilbert as Mobster
 Laine Trzinski as Mary Jeffers
 Phillip Tan as Chinese Waiter

Reception 
Writing in Ain't It Cool News, Scott Foy said, "Honestly, I can't decide whether to recommend the movie or not. I swear there are moments in this movie where you want to laugh and bang your head against the wall out of frustration at the same time."  BeyondHollywood.com wrote, "So shut off your brain and enjoy the ride. Timecop 2 is definitely better than the first, even if it still doesn’t make a lick of sense."

References

External links
 
 

2003 films
2003 direct-to-video films
2003 martial arts films
2003 science fiction action films
2000s American films
2000s English-language films
American martial arts films
American science fiction action films
Cyberpunk films
Direct-to-video sequel films
Films about time travel
Films based on Dark Horse Comics
Films directed by Steve Boyum
Films produced by Mike Elliott
Films set in 2025
Films set in Los Angeles
Films with screenplays by Gary Scott Thompson
Martial arts science fiction films
Timecop (franchise)
Universal Pictures direct-to-video films